Eois inconspicua is a moth in the  family Geometridae. It is found on Dominica.

References

Moths described in 1907
Taxa named by William Warren (entomologist)
Eois
Moths of the Caribbean